David Cruz Vélez was an at-large Puerto Rican Senator from 1989 to 1993.  He was the first blind  New Progressive Party member to form part of a Cabinet when he was the Ombudsman for Persons with Disabilities of Puerto Rico under governor Pedro Rossello Gonzalez.  He was a member of Phi Sigma Alpha fraternity. David Cruz Velez earned a B.A. in Psychology from the University of Puerto Rico and a M.A. in Educational Psychology from New York University.

References

Living people
Members of the Senate of Puerto Rico
New Progressive Party (Puerto Rico) politicians
New York University alumni
University of Puerto Rico alumni
Year of birth missing (living people)